Naresh Kathooria (born: 26 July) is an Indian Punjabi film writer, producer, screenplay and actor. He is best known for Lucky Di Unlucky Story (2013), Carry on Jatta (2012), Bha Ji in Problem (2013) and Uda Aida (2019), Chandigarh Amritsar Chandigarh (2019) and Chakk De Phatte (2008).

Early life 
Naresh was born on 26 July in Giddarbaha, Muktsar, Punjab, India. He graduated from Punjabi University Patiala, Punjab, India.

Career 
Kathooria started his career as a theatre actor and always want to be a part of Punjabi film industry. After growing his acting skills on stage, he just started as screenwriter on theater. Naresh also did some famous TV shows like Comedy Circus. He got fame just after completion of blockbuster Indian Punjabi film Carry On Jatta (2012) and got offer from Bollywood but Naresh prefer to work with Indian Punjabi film industry.

Filmography

Actor

Writer

Producer

References

External links 

 

Living people
Male actors in Punjabi cinema
Punjabi people
Male actors from Punjab, India
Indian male comedians
Year of birth missing (living people)